is a multi-purpose stadium at the Honjo Yuri General Sports Park in Yurihonjo, Akita, Japan. The stadium was originally opened in 1978 and has a capacity of 10,000 spectators. It is the former home ground of TDK SC, and the Sports Park has a Baseball Stadium and tennis courts.

References

External links
Yurihojo City page

Football venues in Japan
Multi-purpose stadiums in Japan
Blaublitz Akita
Sports venues in Akita Prefecture
Athletics (track and field) venues in Japan
Yurihonjō